Rajesh Ekade is an Indian politician from Indian National Congress who is serving as Member of 14th Maharashtra Legislative Assembly from Malkapur Assembly constituency. In 2019 Maharashtra Legislative Assembly election, he won by Chainsukh Madanlal Sancheti with the margin of 14,384.

References 

Living people
Maharashtra MLAs 2019–2024
Indian National Congress politicians from Maharashtra
Year of birth missing (living people)